First Parish Church may refer to one of several churches and church buildings in the United States:

Maine
 First Parish Meetinghouse (Biddeford, Maine), listed on the NRHP in Maine
 First Parish Church (Brunswick, Maine)
 First Parish Church (Portland, Maine)
 First Parish Meetinghouse (Standish, Maine)
 First Parish Congregational Church, Yarmouth

Massachusetts
 First Parish Church Parsonage, Arlington
 First Parish Church of Dorchester
 First Parish Church (Duxbury, Massachusetts)
 First Parish Unitarian Church, Medfield
 First Parish Church in Plymouth
 United First Parish Church (Quincy, Massachusetts)
First Parish Unitarian Universalist Church of Scituate
 First Parish Church (Taunton, Massachusetts)
 First Parish Church (Waltham, Massachusetts)

New Hampshire
 First Parish Church (Dover, New Hampshire)
 First Parish Church Site-Dover Point, Dover